The Land Reform (Scotland) Act 2016 is an Act of the Scottish Parliament which continues the process of land reform in Scotland following the Community Empowerment (Scotland) Act 2015. It is notable for granting Scottish ministers the power to force the sale of private land to community bodies to further sustainable development in the absence of a willing seller.

Provisions
Under the provisions of the Act there is to be a ‘Land Rights and Responsibilities Statement’, setting out the Scottish Government's objectives for land reform, a Scottish Land Commission is to take forward the land reform process, preparing a strategic plan, for the approval of Scottish ministers. One of the new land commissioners is to be a Tenant Farming Commissioner who must be neither an agricultural landlord nor a tenant but who is to be responsible for reviewing issues relating to tenant farming.

A further provision is the creation of the Community Right to Buy for Sustainable Development. This permits Scottish ministers to approve the purchase of privately owned land by a community body with a registered interest. Unlike the Community Right to Buy established by the Land Reform (Scotland) Act 2003 and extended by the Community Empowerment (Scotland) Act 2015, the Community Right to Buy for Sustainable Development does not require a willing seller but allows ministers to compel landowners to sell if they decide that the sale will further sustainable development in the area. In this respect it is similar to the Crofting Community Right to Buy of the 2003 Act which allows crofting communities to purchase croft land and the Community Right to Buy abandoned or derelict land of the 2015 Act, neither of which require a willing seller. Community bodies may also register an interest in allowing a 3rd party to purchase land on the same basis.

Other provisions of the act include new regulations to require persons who control land to be identified, with information obtained to appear in the Land Register of Scotland; the removal of sporting rights exemption from rates, which are to be re-valued; and further powers for Scottish Natural Heritage to control deer management. It also makes provision for notice and consultation where core paths are to be amended.

See also
 Land Reform in Scotland
 Community Empowerment (Scotland) Act 2015
 Land Reform (Scotland) Act 2003

References

2016 in the environment
Acts of the Scottish Parliament 2016
Land reform in Scotland
Scottish culture
Sustainable development